Kate Ceberano and Her Septet is a live album recorded by Australian singer Kate Ceberano, released in March 1987. Ceberano's first solo release, the album peaked at number 29 in Australia.

Background
Whilst still performing with the band I'm Talking in early 1986, Ceberano was asked by events promoter Clifford Hocking to step in and replace a cancelled jazz performer at the Perth International Jazz Festival with a week's notice. Ceberano quickly established a septet and the performance was an unexpected success. Immediately after, Hocking asked Ceberano to perform again at the ANZ Pavilion State Theatre in Melbourne between 13–14 June 1986. According to her 2014 autobiography, Ceberano said the idea "frightened the life out [of her]" as she thought no one would come. However, the performance was a success and the live recording was released as her debut album in 1987.

There was a TV special released, and although not officially released, various clips are available to view on YouTube.

Track listing

Singles
 "I'm Beginning to See the Light" was released as the first and only single from the album in 1987.
It was released as a 2-Track single.

Side A "I'm Beginning to See the Light" 
Side B "Lush Life"

Release history

Charts

Certification

Credits
Bass – Stuart Speed
Drums – Peter Jones
Engineer – Ross Cockle
Guitar – Philip Ceberano
Piano, Arranged By – Jex Saarelaht 
Saxophone – Robert Burke 
Trombone – Russell Smith 
Vibraphone [Vibes], Percussion – Alex Pertout

References

1987 live albums
Kate Ceberano albums
Live jazz albums
Covers albums
Septets